Adela australis is a moth of the family Adelidae or fairy longhorn moths.

Description
These moths have the upper wings crossed by a white belt and a metallic patterns coloration ranging from golden to violet. Males have brown hair on their heads, with very long antennae, 2–3 times as long as the forewing.

They are diurnal and usually swarm around the tips of branches with undulating flights. Adults are on wing in May and June.

Distribution
This species can be found in Spain, France, Italy, Switzerland, Albania and North Macedonia.

References

External links
Papillion-poitou-charentes
EOL
Lepiforum.de

Adelidae
Moths described in 1851
Taxa named by Gustav Heinrich Heydenreich
Moths of Europe